Pozzuolo Martesana ( or Pozzoeul ) is a comune (municipality) in the Metropolitan City of Milan in the Italian region Lombardy, located about  east of Milan. 
 
Pozzuolo Martesana borders the following municipalities: Inzago, Cassano d'Adda, Gorgonzola, Bellinzago Lombardo, Melzo, Truccazzano.

Pozzuolo Martesana is served by Pozzuolo Martesana railway station, the village of Trecella by Trecella railway station.

References

External links
  Official website

Cities and towns in Lombardy